Mehmed Emin Pasha may refer to:

 Kıbrıslı Mehmed Emin Pasha (1813–1871), Ottoman grand vizier (1854, 1859, 1860–61)
 Divitdar Mehmed Emin Pasha (died 1753), Ottoman grand vizier (1750–52)
 Yağlıkçızade Mehmed Emin Pasha (1724–1769), Ottoman grand vizier (1768–69)
 Mehmed Emin Âli Pasha (1815–1871), Ottoman grand vizier (1852, 1855–56, 1858–59, 1861, 1867–71)
 Mehmed Emin Rauf Pasha (1780–1859), Ottoman grand vizier (1815–16, 1833–39, 1841, 1842–46, 1852)
 Emin Pasha (1840–1892), Ottoman German physician, naturalist, and statesman

See also
 Mehmed Emin (disambiguation)
 Mehmed
 Emin